Muhammad Arshad Khan Lodhi (1 October 1937 - 29 January 2019) was a Pakistani politician who served as a Member of the Provincial Assembly of the Punjab, between 1985 and May 2018.

Early life and education
He was born on 1 October 1937 in Jalandhar, India .

He graduated in 1959 from Government College, Lahore and has the degree of Bachelor of Arts and the degree of Bachelor of Laws which he received in 1966 from University of Karachi.

Political career

He was elected to the Provincial Assembly of the Punjab from Constituency PP-204 (Sahiwal) in 1985 Pakistani general election and became Provincial Minister of Punjab for Colonies, Revenue and Relief, Consolidation, Livestock and Dairy Development.

He was re-elected to the Provincial Assembly of the Punjab from Constituency PP-182 (Sahiwal) as a candidate of Islami Jamhoori Ittehad (IJI) in 1988 Pakistani general election. He received 28,036 votes and defeated a candidate of Pakistan Peoples Party (PPP). He became Provincial Minister of Punjab for Revenue.

He was re-elected to the Provincial Assembly of the Punjab from Constituency PP-182 (Sahiwal) as a candidate of IJI in 1990 Pakistani general election. He received 27,324 votes and defeated Haji Riaz Hussain, a candidate of Pakistan Democratic Alliance. He became Provincial Minister of Punjab for Revenue.

He ran for the seat of the Provincial Assembly of the Punjab from Constituency PP-182 (Sahiwal) as a candidate of Pakistan Muslim League (N) (PML-N) in 1993 Pakistani general election, but was unsuccessful. He received 26,724 votes and lost the seat to Haji Riaz Hussain, a candidate of PPP.

He was re-elected to the Provincial Assembly of the Punjab from Constituency PP-182 (Sahiwal) as a candidate of PML-N in 1997 Pakistani general election. He received 36,042 votes and defeated Haji Riaz Hussain, a candidate of PPP. He became Provincial Minister of Punjab for Industries & Mineral Development.

He was re-elected to the Provincial Assembly of the Punjab from Constituency PP-223 (Sahiwal-IV) as a candidate of Pakistan Muslim League (Q) (PML-Q) in 2002 Pakistani general election. He received 24,762 votes and defeated Muhammad Hafeez Akhtar, an independent candidate.

He ran for the seat of the Provincial Assembly of the Punjab from Constituency PP-223 (Sahiwal-IV) as a candidate of PML-Q in 2008 Pakistani general election but was unsuccessful. He received 22,982 votes and lost the seat to Muhammad Hafeez Akhtar, a candidate of PPP.

He was re-elected to the Provincial Assembly of the Punjab as a candidate of PML-N from Constituency PP-223 (Sahiwal-IV) in 2013 Pakistani general election.

Death
He died on 29 January 2019 after suffering heart attack.

References

2019 deaths
Punjab MPAs 2013–2018
1937 births
Pakistan Muslim League (N) politicians
Punjab MPAs 1985–1988
Punjab MPAs 1988–1990
Punjab MPAs 1990–1993
Punjab MPAs 1997–1999
Punjab MPAs 2002–2007